New Ways to Dream is the fifth studio album by Australian recording artist Debra Byrne. The album was released in May 1997 and peaked at number 41 on the ARIA Charts.

Track listing

Charts

References

Debra Byrne albums
1997 albums
Covers albums
Polydor Records albums